"Igreja" ("Church") is a single by Brazilian rock band Titãs, released in 1986, part of their Cabeça Dinossauro album.

Lyrics and composition 
According to songwriter and then bassist and vocalist Nando Reis, the song was written on the acoustic guitar at his mother's house in the district of Butantã, São Paulo:

By the time of the album's release, Reis said:

Reception within the band 
It was one of the last songs to be selected for the album and it stirred controversy among the members themselves - vocalist Arnaldo Antunes, at first, didn't want to record it and would even leave the stage sometimes when the song was performed live. When the members had a meeting at vocalist Branco Mello's apartment to discuss the album's repertoire, vocalist, bassist and saxophonist Paulo Miklos also opposed the song's inclusion, but soon changed his mind as the band performed it live.

Antunes, on the other hand, said "the song is against the Church as the institution, but at the same time I have a problem, for me it is difficult to sing that I don't have a religion, because I do. And the Church has great contributions to the history of men, to the arts, take Botticelli for instance."

Personnel 
Per the Cabeça Dinossauro liner notes:
 Nando Reis - lead vocals
 Arnaldo Antunes - backing vocals
 Branco Mello - backing vocals
 Sérgio Britto - backing vocals
 Marcelo Fromer - lead guitar
 Tony Bellotto - rhythm guitar
 Paulo Miklos - bass
 Charles Gavin - drums

References 

1987 singles
Titãs songs
1987 songs
Warner Music Group singles
Songs written by Nando Reis
Songs critical of religion